Kollam Kanjaveli Kuttilazhikathu Thulasidharan Nair is an actor in Malayalam cinema, who is better known as Kollam Thulasi relating to the name of his birthplace Kollam to his first name as customary in some parts of Kerala. His first appearance was in Mukhya Manthri (1979). He is well known for his unique acting style. He appeared in many television serials. He is also a poet and a politician.

Personal life
He was born in 1949 to Kollam Kanjaveli Kuttilazhikathu P. S. Nair and Bharathi Amma. After completing a master's degree in History, he pursued a diploma in journalism. In 1970, he entered Kerala Govt. Service at Kozhikode corporation. He retired as deputy Secretary from Municipal Service from Thiruvananthapuram corporation. He currently resides in Valiyasala. Daughter: V. T. Gayathri (Engineer). (Son in law) Dr Anoop Sinha (Prof in medical college). Thulasi said he drinks his urine everyday as part of Urine therapy.

Filmography

Malayalam

Tamil

Telugu

Television

References

External links
 
 Kollam Thulasi at MSI
 Kollam Thulasi Turns Hero. Screen, Mumbai, 19 January 2001

Indian male film actors
Living people
Male actors from Kollam
Male actors in Malayalam cinema
1949 births
Male actors in Telugu cinema
Male actors in Tamil cinema
Indian male television actors
Male actors in Malayalam television
20th-century Indian male actors
21st-century Indian male actors